Reeder is an unincorporated community in southwestern Manitoba, Canada. It is located approximately 9 kilometers (6 miles) southwest of Miniota, Manitoba in Prairie View Municipality.

References 

Unincorporated communities in Westman Region